Brașov 2020 was a bid by the city of Brașov and the Romanian Olympic and Sports Committee to host the 2020 Winter Youth Olympics. The International Olympic Committee selected Lausanne as the host city on 31 July 2015.

History

Applicant City Phase

Brașov's bid for the 2020 Winter Youth Olympics was confirmed on 28 November 2013. Brașov signed their Youth Olympic Game Candidature Procedure on 12 December 2013.

This is the first time that Romanian city bidded for the Youth Olympic Games.

In early 2013, Brașov hosted the 2013 European Youth Olympic Winter Festival.

Venues
The proposed plan consisted of venues that were already used in 2013 European Youth Olympic Winter Festival

Notes and references

External links
 Brasov 2020
 Brasov 2020 Facebook Page

2020 Winter Youth Olympics bids
Sport in Brașov
Romania at the Youth Olympics